1995 Belarusian First League was the fifth season of 2nd level football championship in Belarus. It started in July and ended in November 1995.

Team changes from 1994–95 season
The two best teams of 1994–95 First League (MPKC Mozyr and Ataka-Aura Minsk) were promoted to Belarusian Premier League. They were replaced by two lowest placed teams of 1994–95 Premier League (Gomselmash Gomel and Lokomotiv Vitebsk).

The three lowest-placed teams of the last season (ZLiN Gomel, AFViS-RShVSM Minsk and Stroitel Vitebsk) relegated to the Second League. Stroitel Vitebsk eventually disbanded before the start of the season. These teams were replaced by three best teams of 1994–95 Second League (Naftan-Devon Novopolotsk, Fomalgaut Borisov and Dinamo-Juni Minsk).

Before the start of the season, Gomselmash Gomel were renamed to FC Gomel.

Santanas Samokhvalovichi, placed 8th last season, withdrew to amateur level due to financial troubles, leaving the league with 15 teams for this season.

Overview
Newcomers Naftan-Devon Novopolotsk won the tournament and were promoted to the Premier League. Runners-up Kommunalnik Pinsk qualified to the promotion play-offs against 15th team of Premier League but lost and remained in the First League. Khimvolokno Grodno, who finished 15th, relegated to the Second League.

Teams and locations

League table

Promotion play-off
Kommunalnik Pinsk had to play two-legged play-off against Shinnik Bobruisk, who finished 15th in Premier League. Shinnik won and both teams remained in their respective leagues.

Top goalscorers

See also
1995 Belarusian Premier League
1995–96 Belarusian Cup

External links
RSSSF

Belarusian First League seasons
2
Belarus